Pettengill may refer to:

People
Pettingill family, an Australian criminal family
Dawn Pettengill (born 1955), American politician
Gordon Pettengill (1926–2021), American radio astronomer and planetary physicist
Samuel B. Pettengill (1886–1974), American politician and nephew of William Horace Clagett
Todd Pettengill (born 1961), American radio disc jockey
Tracey Pettengill Turner (born c. 1971), entrepreneur

Other uses
3831 Pettengill, a main-belt asteroid
C. F. Pettengill House, historic house at 53 Revere Road in Quincy, Massachusetts
Estadio Juan Canuto Pettengill, multi-use stadium in Itaugua, Paraguay